The pericallosal cistern is one of the subarachnoid cisterns. It lies along the top of the corpus callosum from the splenium to the genu. It then joins the cistern of lamina terminalis which connects it with the chiasmatic cistern.

References

 Meninges